The Ministry of Foreign Affairs is a ministry in Zambia. It is headed by the Minister of Foreign Affairs, who is responsible for conducting foreign relations.

List of ministers
The following is a list of Foreign Ministers of Zambia since the country gained independence in 1964:

References

Foreign
Foreign Ministers